Rudolf Ehlers (March 30, 1834 – August 7, 1908) was a German theologian and clergyman born in Hamburg.

He received his education at the Universities of Heidelberg, Berlin and Göttingen. At Heidelberg, he was a student of Richard Rothe (1799-1867). After completion of studies he served as a pastor in Stolberg, and in 1864 relocated to the Protestant Reformed Church at Frankfurt am Main. In 1868 he was appointed Konsistorialrat.

In 1879 he became co-editor of the journal "Zeitschrift fur praktische Theologie", and in 1884 was co-founder and vice-president of the Allgemeinen evangelisch-protestantischen Missionsvereins, today known as Deutschen Ostasienmission (German East Asia Mission). In 1889 he was awarded with an honorary doctorate from the University of Jena.

Selected publications 
 Evangelische Predigten (Evangelical sermons), 1873.
 Das alte Gesetz und die neue Zeit (The old law and the new life), 1877.
 Bilder aus dem Leben des Apostels Paulus (Pictures from the life of the Apostle Paul), 1886.
 Richard Rothe, 1906.

References 
  English translation
 The Encyclopedia Americana (biography)
 

19th-century German Protestant theologians
19th-century Calvinist and Reformed theologians
German Calvinist and Reformed ministers
Clergy from Hamburg
1908 deaths
1834 births
German male non-fiction writers
19th-century male writers